The China Journal is a journal of scholarship, information and analysis about China and Taiwan. It covers anthropology, sociology, and political science. Two issues are published per year by University of Chicago Press on behalf of The Australian Centre for China in the world (having previously been published on behalf of the ANU's National University College of Asia and the Pacific). Its current editors are Anita Chan, Ben Hillman, and Jonathan Unger (Australian National University).

The former title of "The China Journal" was "The Australian Journal of Chinese Affairs" ,  under which name it was published from 1979 to 1995

Abstracting and indexing 
The journal is abstracted and indexed in the Social Sciences Citation Index and is listed in the Journal Citation Reports with a 2019 impact factor of 2.750 It is also indexed in PubMed,   International Bibliography of the Social Sciences, GEOBASE, Historical Abstracts, International Political Science Abstracts, ProQuest 5000, and MLA International Bibliography.

References

External links 

 

Chinese studies journals
English-language journals
Publications established in 1979
Biannual journals